Visitors to Grenada must obtain a visa from one of the Grenadian diplomatic missions or in certain cases in United Kingdom diplomatic missions unless they come from one of the visa exempt countries or countries whose citizens may obtain a visa on arrival. Cruise ship passengers of all nationalities can visit Grenada for up to 24 hours without a visa.

Grenada signed a mutual visa-waiver agreement with the European Union on 28 May 2015 which was ratified on 15 December 2015.

Citizens of Canada, United Kingdom and the United States are exempt from holding a passport and may enter on a declaration while using a proof of citizenship bearing a photograph and one photo ID. When departing from the United States, however, a passport is required per the regulations of U.S. Department of Homeland Security.

Visa policy of Grenada

Visa exemption

Freedom of movement

6 months
Holders of passports or birth certificates of  can enter Grenada without a visa for a maximum stay of 6 months. Applicable to all classes of British nationality. However, British nationals (except for British Overseas Territories citizens of Montserrat) using their birth certificates are only granted a stay of 3 months.

3 months
Holders of passports issued by the following 102 jurisdictions can enter Grenada without a visa for a maximum stay of 3 months (unless otherwise noted).  Extensions of stay may be obtained at the Immigration Authorities Office in Grenada.

1 - Applicable also to those who hold a birth certificate and a photo ID, however a passport is required when departing from United States.

Non-ordinary passports
In addition, only holders of diplomatic, official and service passports issued to nationals of Haiti do not require a visa.

Conditional visa on arrival
Holders of passports issued by the following 11 countries can apply for a visa on arrival if they are holding a pre-clearance letter issued by Grenada.

See also

 Visa requirements for Grenadian citizens

References

Grenada
Foreign relations of Grenada